LTZ or ltz may refer to:

 a high-end trim of Chevrolet vehicles.
 Luxembourgish language ISO 639 code
 Less than Zero (disambiguation), various topics